Ouvrage La Salmagne is a petit ouvrage of the Maginot Line, built as part of the "New Fronts" program to address shortcomings in the Line's coverage of the border with Belgium. Like the other three ouvrages near Maubeuge, it is built on an old Séré de Rivières system fortification, near the town of Bersillies. The Ouvrage Bersillies is nearby to the northwest. La Salmagne has been preserved and is open to the public.

Séré de Rivières 
The original Ouvrage de la Salmagne was built to the northeast of Bersillies in 1884-1895 as part of the Séré de Rivières fortifications of Maubeuge. The trapezoidal fort is surrounded by a ditch defended by counterscarps. It was armed with six 120mm guns, four 95mm guns and several smaller pieces. La Salmagne was attacked by German forces in 1914 during the Siege of Maubeuge. It surrendered to the Germans on 5 September 1914.

Design and construction 
The Maginot-era site was approved in 1934. Work  cost 6.2 million francs.

Description 
La Salmagne comprises two combat blocks. The ouvrage was built within the walls of the old Ouvrage de la Salmagne. An underground gallery connects the two blocks, with underground service and barracks spaces under Block 1.

 Block 1: infantry block with one automatic rifle cloche (GFM-B), one mixed-arms cloche (AM) and one retractable mixed-arms turret.
 Block 2: infantry/entrance block with two GFM cloches, one grenade launcher cloche (LG), one automatic rifle embrasure and one machine gun/47mm anti-tank gun (JM/AC47) embrasure.

Manning 
The 1940 manning of the ouvrage under the command of Captain Brichard comprised 97 men and 3 officers of the 84th Fortress Infantry Regiment. The units were under the umbrella of the 101st Fortress Infantry Division, 1st Army, Army Group 1.

History of the Maginot ouvrage 
See Fortified Sector of Maubeuge for a broader discussion of the events of 1940 in the Maubeuge sector of the Maginot Line.
During the Battle of France in 1940, the invading German forces approached Maubeuge from the south and east, to the rear of the defensive line. The German 28th Infantry Division moved along the line of fortifications 19–22 May, rolling up blockhouses and larger fortifications. La Salmagne was hit with aerial and artillery bombardments. After the fall of Ouvrage Boussois on 22 May the Germans concentrated on La Salmagne, which had been supporting its neighbor. 15 cm gunfire was concentrated on Block 2, which was evacuated at 1500. After the AM cloche on Block 1 was destroyed by explosives the position lost all means of resistance.  Facing asphyxiation from smoke and fumes, La Salmagne's garrison surrendered at 2030. During the ensuing years of World War II, Salmagne was stripped of salvageable metals by the Germans.

Current condition 
La Salmagne is managed by the Association des Amis de la Forteresse du Secteur Fortifié de Maubeuge. The fort is open to the public on weekends during the summer months.

See also 
 List of all works on Maginot Line
 Siegfried Line
 Atlantic Wall
 Czechoslovak border fortifications

Notes

References

Bibliography 
Allcorn, William. The Maginot Line 1928-45. Oxford: Osprey Publishing, 2003. 
Degon, André; Zylberyng, Didier, La Ligne Maginot: Guide des Forts à Visiter, Editions Ouest-France, 2014.  
Kaufmann, J.E. and Kaufmann, H.W. Fortress France: The Maginot Line and French Defenses in World War II, Stackpole Books, 2006. 
Kaufmann, J.E., Kaufmann, H.W., Jancovič-Potočnik, A. and Lang, P. The Maginot Line: History and Guide, Pen and Sword, 2011. 
Mary, Jean-Yves; Hohnadel, Alain; Sicard, Jacques. Hommes et Ouvrages de la Ligne Maginot, Tome 1. Paris, Histoire & Collections, 2001.  
Mary, Jean-Yves; Hohnadel, Alain; Sicard, Jacques. Hommes et Ouvrages de la Ligne Maginot, Tome 2. Paris, Histoire & Collections, 2003.  
Mary, Jean-Yves; Hohnadel, Alain; Sicard, Jacques. Hommes et Ouvrages de la Ligne Maginot, Tome 3. Paris, Histoire & Collections, 2003.  
Mary, Jean-Yves; Hohnadel, Alain; Sicard, Jacques. Hommes et Ouvrages de la Ligne Maginot, Tome 5. Paris, Histoire & Collections, 2009.

External links 
Official site 
Salmagne (petit ouvrage de) at fortiff.be 
Petit ouvrage de la Salmagne at lignemaginot.com 
Petit ouvrage de la Salmagne at TracesOfWar.com
Le PO de la Salmagne at wikimaginot.eu 

SALM
Maginot Line
Séré de Rivières system
World War I museums in France
World War II museums in France
Fortifications of Maubeuge